Tradebe is a waste management company based in Barcelona that was established in 1980. It operates in Spain, France, the United Kingdom, the United States and Oman. The chairman is Josep Creixell, and the Chief Executive is Victor Creixell.

Tradebe is a significant player in the solvent recycling and automated oil tank cleaning markets.

Prosecutions
The company has been prosecuted in the UK. In 2016 it was fined £38,960 after a chemical leak at their Hendon Dock plant in Sunderland.  It was prosecuted in 2013 after  a spillage of highly flammable liquid at a site in Knottingley.  The United States Environmental Protection Agency fined it after environmental violations at the firm’s hazardous waste treatment facilities in Connecticut. Their subsidiary Norlite had to pay around £15,000 for air pollution violations in Cohoes, New York, in 2016.

Acquisitions
 1984  Acquisition of Fragsa, which since 1975 had been working in the management and recycling of out-of-service vehicles using processes for the fragmentation and separation of metals.
 1989  Ecoimsa obtains authorization for the collection of hydrocarbon waste from ships (Marpol).
 1990  Acquisition of Fragnor, a fragmentation plant located in Amorebieta (Vizcaya) 
 1992  Acquisition of Lunagua with the goal of setting up an industrial waste treatment plant 
 1997  Creation of Intraval to develop new lines of business in consultancy, engineering and treatment of urban solid waste. 
 1998  Construction and development of a composting plant in Jorba (Barcelona).
 2002 Acquisition of Ecología Química located in Gualba (Barcelona) specializing in the recycling of solvents from the chemical and pharmaceutical industries. Establishment of Recovery & Recycling Solutions located in Houston, the “center” of the world’s oil industry.
 2003 Purchase of Willacy Oil Services, founded in 1989, providing an extensive range of equipment and services for the treatment of refinery sludge.
 2003 Purchase of Tecnoambiente, a pioneering consultancy company in Spain for the provision of comprehensive environmental services.
 2004 Acquisition of Linersa, consolidating the group’s presence in the Basque Country.
 2004 Initiation of Soil Remediation activities.
 2006/7 Acquisition of AWS in Dinnington and the subsidiaries of United Utilities in Ellesmere Port and Gwent.
 2008 Acquisition of PSI (New Orleans) and PCI (Chicago).
 2009 Acquisition of Tradebe Fawley, one of only two industrial waste incineration plants in the United Kingdom.	
 2010 Acquisition of Britcare Ltd, through which Tradebe provides clinical waste collection and treatment services.
 2011 Acquisition of Solvent Resource Management, leader in the preparation and supply of alternative fuels for the cement industry in the United Kingdom and European leader in solvent recycling, together with its subsidiary MRM, a specialist in the recycling and processing of mineral waste from raw materials for subsequent use in the cement industry. SRM and MRM have seven operating sites.  Acquisition of United Industrial Services, an environmental services company which has been managing the largest regional network of treatment centers in the northeastern United States since 1976. It manages five treatment facilities.  Facility openings in Spain: Tradebe Vallbona (metal recycling plant) and Tradebe Valdilecha (waste landfill).
 2012 Acquisition of Ecowaste, located in Avonmouth, a company which provides services for the collection of clinical waste in the southwest of England.
 2013 Inauguration of Tradebe Port Services, first hydrocarbon storage terminal, located in the Port of Barcelona. Entry to Brazil: First contract obtained with the company Intercement for the development and supply of waste-derived fuel.  Creation of Tradebe Healthcare Holdings Ltd through a joint venture with Sita UK for the management of clinical waste in the United Kingdom.  Acquisition of leader in low radioactive waste management in the UK (Inutec).
 2014 Acquisition of leading distributors of packaged solvents – Solvents with Safety – and leading provider of specialist environmental process and disposal services to the oil and gas industry – Scotoil – in the UK.
 2015 In November 2015, Tradebe signed an important five-year contract with Petroleum Development Oman
 2017 Acquisition of First Response Environmental Group, Badger Disposal (Tradebe Treatment and Recycling of Wisconsin, LLC)
 2018 Tradebe acquires assets of COMSA Environment and Avanti Environmental Group from Stericycle Inc.  a laboratory waste specialist, Labwaste, and the Winfrith nuclear site in 2018. At that point it employed about 140 people in the UK. The UK headquarters is in Marlow, Buckinghamshire.

In 2018 it was involved in the debate over clinical waste management in the UK and the collapse of Healthcare Environmental Services. It owns and operates its own treatment and incineration facilities and said that there was "sufficient waste incineration capacity within the UK to meet current market demand".

It is to take over clinical waste management in Scotland in August 2019.

References

Medical waste
Companies based in Barcelona
Waste management companies of Spain
Waste companies established in 1980
Spanish companies established in 1980